This is a list of notable events in Latin music (music from the Spanish- and Portuguese-speaking areas of Latin America, Latin Europe, and the United States) that took place in 1986.

Events 
February 24The 28th Annual Grammy Awards are held at The Shrine Auditorium in Los Angeles, California.:<
Lani Hall wins the Grammy Award for Best Latin Pop Performance for Es Facil Amar.
Vikki Carr wins the Grammy Award for Best Mexican/Mexican-American Performance for Simplemente Mujer.
Tito Puente wins the Grammy Award for Best Tropical Latin Performance for Mambo Diablo.
October 4Billboard establishes the Hot Latin 50 chart (now known as the Hot Latin Songs chart). On the printed publication "Yo No Sé Qué Me Pasó" by Juan Gabriel is the first number-one song on the chart. On the Billboard electronic database however, "La Guirnalda" by Rocío Dúrcal, is the first number one song on the week ending 6 September 1986.

Bands formed

Bands reformed

Bands disbanded

Bands on hiatus

Number-ones albums and singles by country 
List of number-one albums of 1986 (Spain)
List of number-one singles of 1986 (Spain)
List of number-one Billboard Latin Pop Albums of 1986
List of number-one Billboard Regional Mexican Albums of 1986
List of number-one Billboard Tropical Albums of 1986
List of number-one Billboard Top Latin Songs of 1986

Awards 
1986 Tejano Music Awards

Albums released

Best-selling albums
The following is a list of the top 5 best-selling Latin albums of 1986 in the United States divided into the categories of Latin pop, Regional Mexican, and Tropical/salsa, according to Billboard.

Births 
December 10Natti Natasha, Dominican Republic reggaeton singer

Deaths

References 

 
Latin music by year